Stefan Lončar (born 19 February 1996) is a Montenegrin professional footballer who plays as a defensive midfielder for Hungarian club Debrecen.

Club career

Sutjeska
Lončar made his professional debut with hometown team Sutjeska. In September 2016, he joined Serbian team FK Rad on the last day of the summer transfer window. After six months at Rad, Lončar didn't play a game and returned to Sutjeska. After two more seasons at Sutjeska, he was recognized as the best player of the Montenegrin First League in 2018.

Alavés

Loan to Istra 1961
On 20 January 2019, it was announced that Lončar signed a contract with Spanish club Alavés, lasting until the summer of 2021. Upon signing, he was immediately sent on a one-season loan to Croatian club Istra 1961, whose ownership was bought by Alavés in the summer of 2018. On 29 September 2019, he scored his first goal for Istra in a 1–1 tie with Hajduk Split.

Debrecen
On 10 January 2023, Lončar moved to Debrecen in Hungary.

International career
On 28 May 2018, Lončar made his international debut for Montenegro in an exhibition match Bosnia and Herzegovina which ended in a 0–0 tie.

References

1996 births
Footballers from Nikšić
Living people
Montenegrin footballers
Montenegro international footballers
Association football midfielders
FK Sutjeska Nikšić players
FK Rad players
NK Istra 1961 players
FK Novi Pazar players
Debreceni VSC players
Montenegrin First League players
Croatian Football League players
Serbian SuperLiga players
Nemzeti Bajnokság I players
Montenegrin expatriate footballers
Expatriate footballers in Serbia
Montenegrin expatriate sportspeople in Serbia
Expatriate footballers in Croatia
Montenegrin expatriate sportspeople in Croatia
Expatriate footballers in Hungary
Montenegrin expatriate sportspeople in Hungary